San Jacinto is a municipality, in the Chiquimula department of Guatemala. It has a population of 12,619 (2018 census) and cover an area of 72 km2.

References

	

Municipalities of the Chiquimula Department